
Environment of the Netherlands

The Netherlands had a 2018 Forest Landscape Integrity Index mean score of 0.6/10, ranking it 169th globally out of 172 countries.

Biota
 List of birds of the Netherlands
 List of extinct animals of the Netherlands
 List of non-marine molluscs of the Netherlands

See also
 European Commissioner for the Environment
 Environmental issue
 Bevrijdingsbos
 Dutch pollutant standards
 Geology of the Netherlands
 Litter in the Netherlands
 Ministry of Housing, Spatial Planning and the Environment
 Staatsbosbeheer

References

External links
Waste policy at the Ministry for Housing, Spatial Planning and the Environment (VROM)